John Hemming may refer to:
John Hemming (historian) (born 1935), British explorer and author
John Hemming (politician) (born 1960), British politician

See also
John Heminges, co-publisher of Shakespeare's works after his death
John Hemings, a slave of Thomas Jefferson